El corrido de Lupe Reyes is a Mexican telenovela produced by Televisa for Telesistema Mexicano in 1966.

Cast 
David Reynoso
Magda Guzmán
Guillermo Zetina
Alicia Gutiérrez

References

External links 

Mexican telenovelas
1966 telenovelas
Televisa telenovelas
Spanish-language telenovelas
1966 Mexican television series debuts
1966 Mexican television series endings